Altamont may refer to:

Places

Canada
 Altamont, British Columbia
 Altamont, Manitoba

India
 Altamont Road, in south Mumbai

United States
 Altamont, California
 Altamont Pass, in California
 Altamont, Illinois
 Altamont, Kansas
 Altamont, Maryland
 Altamont, Missouri
 Altamont, New York
 Tupper Lake (town), New York, formerly Altamont, in Franklin County
 Altamont, North Carolina
 Altamont, Ohio
 Altamont, Oregon
 Altamont, Pennsylvania
 Altamont, South Carolina
 Altamont, South Dakota
 Altamont, Tennessee
 Altamont, Utah

Enterprises and organizations
 Altamont Apparel, a clothing brand
 The Altamont Enterprise, a weekly newspaper in Albany County, New York
 Altamont Raceway Park, a motorsports race track located in Alameda County in Northern California and site of the Altamont Free Concert
 Altamont School, Birmingham, Alabama

Fictional entities

Characters
 Captain Altamont, the archenemy of Captain Hatteras in The Adventures of Captain Hatteras.
 Altamont, the alias used by Sherlock Holmes in the story "His Last Bow"
 Frederick Altamont, an alias of a pirate in Walter Scott's novel The Pirate
 Frederick Altamont Cornwallis Twistleton, 5th Earl of Ickenham, or Uncle Fred, in the P. G. Wodehouse novels
 Mr. Frederic Altamont, a character in W. M. Thackeray's Memoirs of Mr. Charles J. Yellowplush

Places
 Altamont, Catawba, the stand-in for Asheville, North Carolina in Thomas Wolfe's Look Homeward, Angel

Music
 Altamont (band)
 Altamont Free Concert, a 1969 rock concert held in Altamont, California
 "Altamont", a song by Aphrodite's Child on their album 666
 "Altamont", a song by Echo & The Bunnymen on their album Evergreen

Transportation
 Altamont Corridor Express

See also

 
 
 Mont Alta, a former ski area of Quebec